Cloverdale is a census-designated place (CDP) in Botetourt County, Virginia, United States. The population was 3,410 at the 2020 census, which was an increase from the 3,119 reported in 2010. It is part of the Roanoke Metropolitan Statistical Area.

Cloverdale is the birthplace of Charles Follis, who became the first African-American to play professional football when he signed with the Shelby Blues in 1904.

Geography
Cloverdale is located at  (37.361008, −79.904575) in Botetourt County.

According to the United States Census Bureau, the CDP has a total area of 3.1 square miles (8.1 km2), all land.

Demographics

As of the census of 2000, there were 2,986 people, 1,158 households, and 858 families residing in the CDP. The population density was 956.2 people per square mile (369.5/km2). There were 1,204 housing units at an average density of 385.6/sq mi (149.0/km2). The racial makeup of the CDP was 95.01% White, 2.21% African American, 0.10% Native American, 1.17% Asian, 0.80% from other races, and 0.70% from two or more races. Hispanic or Latino of any race were 0.77% of the population.

There were 1,158 households, out of which 37.0% had children under the age of 18 living with them, 63.4% were married couples living together, 8.0% had a female householder with no husband present, and 25.9% were non-families. 22.4% of all households were made up of individuals, and 6.9% had someone living alone who was 65 years of age or older. The average household size was 2.58 and the average family size was 3.05.

In the CDP, the population was spread out, with 26.9% under the age of 18, 7.0% from 18 to 24, 28.4% from 25 to 44, 27.3% from 45 to 64, and 10.5% who were 65 years of age or older. The median age was 39 years. For every 100 females there were 95.7 males. For every 100 females age 18 and over, there were 92.0 males.

The median income for a household in the CDP was $51,847, and the median income for a family was $55,893. Males had a median income of $40,369 versus $27,566 for females. The per capita income for the CDP was $25,075. About 6.3% of families and 8.2% of the population were below the poverty line, including 8.7% of those under age 18 and 6.2% of those age 65 or over.

References

Census-designated places in Botetourt County, Virginia
Census-designated places in Virginia